Gaozhou is a county-level city in southwestern Guangdong Province, China. Formerly the primary city in the area, it is now administered as part of the prefecture-level city of Maoming. As of the 20210 census, Gaozhou had a population of 1,328,658 living in its  territory, nevertheless its built-up (or metro) area is much smaller. The locals speak a variation of the Gaozhou dialect. It is best known in China for being the ancestral home of Leo Ku.

History
Gaozhou is a historically important city in Guangdong. Under the Qing, it was the seat of  overseeing Dianbai, Huazhou, Maoming, "Sih-ching", Wuchuan, and Xinyi Counties.

Administration
Administratively, Gaozhou is a county-level city under the jurisdiction of the provincial-level city Maoming in Guangdong Province. The city of Gaozhou consists of five districts (Panzhou, Shanmei, Baoguang, Shizailing, and Jinshan); the county includes another 23 towns.

Geography

Transportation
China National Highway 207
China National expressway G65
China National expressway S14

Climate

See also
List of administrative divisions of Guangdong

References

External links

 Gaozhou government website  
 Guangdong Statistical Yearbook 

County-level cities in Guangdong
Maoming